Steve Southerland may refer to:

Steve Southerland (Tennessee politician) (born 1955), member of the Tennessee House of Representatives
Steve Southerland (Florida politician) (born 1965), United States Representative for Florida's 2nd District